Dainfern is a golfing estate in Johannesburg, South Africa. It is located in Region 1 and Region 5.
Dainfern is between Johannesburg and Pretoria. Dainfern's postal code is 2055.

Dainfern is sub-divided into several "villages" as it is quite large. Among these are Sherwood, Hampstead, Highgate, Montagu, Riverwood. It is an enclosed housing area. Dainfern Ridge and Dainfern Valley are smaller urban areas near Dainfern.

Facilities
Dainfern has an eighteen-hole golf course surrounding the estate; the course has tarred pathways to enable golf carts to access the course. The course was designed by the professional golfer Gary Player. Other facilities include; tennis courts, swimming pools, a volleyball court, squash courts and hiking trails. The central club house contains a restaurant and other facilities.

Notable residents

 Amor Vittone – musician
 Joost van der Westhuizen – Springbok rugbyplayer (d. 2017)
 Lebo M – composer
 Robert Marawa – sports anchor
 Thabo TboTouch Molefe – radio personality
 Arnold Banks – model and photographer

References

External links
 Dainfern Golf Estate
 Golfing in Dainfern

Johannesburg Region A